Jacques Landauze is a 1920 French silent drama film directed by André Hugon and starring Marguerite de Barbieux, Maud Richard and Séverin-Mars.

Cast
 Marguerite de Barbieux as Denise Desgranges  
 Maud Richard as Germaine Montazon  
 Séverin-Mars as Jacques Landauze / Dumontel  
 Jean Toulout as Montazon

References

Bibliography
 Rège, Philippe. Encyclopedia of French Film Directors, Volume 1. Scarecrow Press, 2009.

External links

1920 films
Films directed by André Hugon
French silent feature films
French black-and-white films
French drama films
1920 drama films
Silent drama films
1920s French films